Georges Favre (26 July 1905 – 25 April 1993) was a French composer and musicologist. He was a student of Paul Dukas for composition and Vincent d'Indy for conducting.

He composed a few pieces for piano, the opera Guna, and a sonata for violin and piano. He is better known as musicologist. He supported his PhD thesis on Boieldieu and published many works on Dukas. He was Inspector General of Music at the Ministry of Education.

Musical works 
 Cantate du jardin vert (on texts by Madeleine Ley). Recording under the direction of Louis Frémaux - , microgroove 33 1/3 rpm, s.d., circa 1958.

Literary works 
1987: 
1986:  Silhouettes du Conservatoire : Charles-Marie Widor, André Gedalge, Max d'Ollone, La Pensée universelle, 
1983: Compositeurs français méconnus : Ernest Guiraud et ses Amis, Émile Paladilhe et Théodore Dubois, La Pensée universelle, 
1982: Musique et Naturalisme : Alfred Bruneau and Émile Zola, La Pensée universelle, 
1979: La Vicomtesse Vigier : Sophie Cruvelli 1826-1907 Une Grande Cantatrice Niçoise, La Pensée universelle, 
1976: Études musicales monégasques : notes d'histoire (XVIIIe-XXe siècles), A. et J. Picard, 
1966: Écrits sur la musique et l'éducation musicale, Paris,  Éditions Durand & Cie; 
1985: Richard Wagner par le disque, Paris, Éditions Durand & Cie, 
1948: Paul Dukas, La Colombe, Collection Euterpe 
1944–45 Boieldieu, sa vie, son œuvre, Prix Dodo of the Académie française
1953: La musique française de piano avant 1830, Paris

External links 
  Georges Favre, Histoire de l'éducation musicale, Paris, La Pensée universelle, 1980 (compte rendu) on Persée
 Georges Favre on the site of the Académie française
  Histoire Musicale de la Principauté de Monaco, du XVIe au XXe siècle by Georges Favre on JSTOR

20th-century French musicologists
1905 births
People from Saintes, Charente-Maritime
1993 deaths
French classical composers
French male classical composers
20th-century French male musicians